Barbados competed at the 2004 Summer Olympics in Athens, Greece, from 13 to 29 August 2004. This nation marked its ninth appearance at the Olympics, except the 1980 Summer Olympics in Moscow because of the United States boycott.

The Barbados Olympic Association sent the nation's smallest team to the Games since the 1976 Summer Olympics in Montreal. A total of ten athletes, nine men and one woman, competed only in five different sports. Half of them had previously competed in Sydney, including track star and Olympic bronze medalist Obadele Thompson, and four-time Olympic skeet shooter Michael Maskell, who later became the nation's flag bearer in the opening ceremony.

Barbados left Athens without a single Olympic medal, although Thompson managed to achieve a seventh-place finish in the 100 metres as the nation's highest result.

Athletics 

Barbadian athletes have so far achieved qualifying standards in the following athletics events (up to a maximum of 3 athletes in each event at the 'A' Standard, and 1 at the 'B' Standard).

Men

Women

Key
Note–Ranks given for track events are within the athlete's heat only
Q = Qualified for the next round
q = Qualified for the next round as a fastest loser or, in field events, by position without achieving the qualifying target
NR = National record
N/A = Round not applicable for the event
Bye = Athlete not required to compete in round

Cycling

Track
Sprint

Judo

Barbados has qualified a single judoka.

Shooting 

Men

Swimming 

Barbadian swimmers earned qualifying standards in the following events (up to a maximum of 2 swimmers in each event at the A-standard time, and 1 at the B-standard time):

Men

See also
 Barbados at the 2003 Pan American Games
 Barbados at the 2004 Summer Paralympics

References

External links
Official Report of the XXVIII Olympiad
Barbados Olympic Association

Nations at the 2004 Summer Olympics
2004
Summer Olympics